Ephestiodes gilvescentella, the dusky raisin moth, is a moth of the family Pyralidae. It is native to North America, where it has been recorded from California, Arizona, Oklahoma, Utah, Montana, Alberta and British Columbia. It was introduced to Hawaii by commerce.

The wingspan is 12–16 mm. Adults are light grayish-tan with irregular bands of brown scales across the middle of the forewings and near the apex.

The larvae have been recorded feeding on raisins, prunes, walnuts, cones and yeast.

External links

Images
Bug Guide
Insects on Dried Fruits

Moths described in 1887
Phycitinae
Taxa named by Émile Louis Ragonot